Buster is the given name of the following people:

Buster Drayton (born 1952), American boxer
Buster Glosson, retired U.S. Air Force lieutenant general
Buster Mathis (1943–1995), American heavyweight boxer
Buster Mathis Jr. (born 1970), American heavyweight boxer, son of Buster Mathis
Buster Mills (1908–1991), American Major League Baseball outfielder, coach, scout and interim manager